Chech is a geographical and historical region encompassing parts of Bulgaria and Greece.

Chech may also refer to:
 Chech, an archaeological site in Dzitás Municipality, Mexico
 Charlie Chech, basketball player

See also 
 Czech (disambiguation)
 Čech
 Chach (disambiguation)
 Cheech (disambiguation)
 Ciucea, a commune of Romania
 Erg Chech, an area in the Sahara